Obsesión is the first album by Spanish glam metal band Sangre Azul, released in 1987 by Hispavox.

Track listing
*All tracks by Sangre Azul, except where noted
Side one
 "Obsesión" 3:18
 "Sediento de sangre" 4:05
 "Todo mi mundo eres tú" (Letra: José Castañosa; Música: Carlos Raya / J.A. Martín) 4:25
 "Velocidad" 2:56
 "El rey de la ciudad" (Letra: José Castañosa; Música: Carlos Raya / J.A. Martín) 4:35
Side two
 "América" 4:00
 "Maestro del crimen" 3:33
 "Tras de ti" 3:36
 "Sólo fue un sueño" 3:28
 "Invadiendo tu ciudad" 3:16

Personnel
Tony Solo - vocals
Carlos Raya - guitar
J. A. Martín - guitar
Julio Díaz - bass
Luis Santurde - drums
James SK Wān - bamboo flute

References

1987 albums